Dennis Goossens (born 16 December 1993) is a Belgian male artistic gymnast, representing his nation in international competitions. He participated in two editions of the World Championships (2013 in Antwerp, and 2015 in Glasgow, Scotland), and qualified for the 2016 Summer Olympics.

References

External links 
 

1993 births
Living people
Belgian male artistic gymnasts
People from Lokeren
Gymnasts at the 2016 Summer Olympics
Olympic gymnasts of Belgium
Sportspeople from East Flanders